Gurimite is a rare mineral with formula Ba3(VO4)2. It is a simple barium vanadate, one of the most simple barium minerals known. It is named after its type locality - Gurim anticline in Israel. It has formed in the rocks of the Hatrurim Formation. Gurimite's stoichiometry is similar to that of copper vanadates mcbirneyite and pseudolyonsite. An example of other barium vanadate mineral is tokyoite.

References

Barium minerals
Vanadate minerals
Trigonal minerals
Minerals in space group 166